The Division of Adelaide is an Australian electoral division in South Australia and is named for the city of Adelaide, South Australia's capital.

At the 2016 federal election, the electorate covered 76 km², is centred on the Adelaide city centre and spanning from Grand Junction Road in the north to Cross Road in the south and from Portrush Road in the east to Marion and Holbrooks Road in the west, taking in suburbs including Ashford, Enfield, Goodwood, Kent Town, Keswick, Kilburn, Mansfield Park, Maylands, Northgate, Norwood, Parkside, Prospect, Rose Park, St Peters, Toorak Gardens, Torrensville, Thebarton, Unley and Walkerville.

Geography
Since 1984, federal electoral division boundaries in Australia have been determined at redistributions by a redistribution committee appointed by the Australian Electoral Commission. Redistributions occur for the boundaries of divisions in a particular state, and they occur every seven years, or sooner if a state's representation entitlement changes or when divisions of a state are malapportioned.

History

The division of Adelaide was one of seven single-member seats established when the seven-member statewide Division of South Australia was abolished following the inaugural 1901 election. For the first 40 years after Federation, it was one of the few Federation seats in the state that regularly changed hands between the Australian Labor Party and the conservative parties. Despite the bellwether-like swinging tendency, unusually the only time Adelaide was obtained by an incoming government was in 1931.

However, Labor held it for all but six years from 1943 to 1993, including a 23-year Labor hold during the Robert Menzies era. For most of the time from 1943 to 1987, it was a fairly safe Labor seat. Labor's hold on the seat loosened slightly in the late 1980s due to pro-Liberal demographic change; it was briefly lost to the Liberals at a 1988 by-election, but regained in 1990.

Very similar to the modern-day state-level electoral district of Adelaide, historically the federal-level Division of Adelaide covered only the Adelaide city centre and a few nearby inner north suburbs up to Regency Road in Prospect for most of its first century.

Later years
A pre-1993 boundary redistribution pushed the seat to the south, adding Liberal-friendly suburbs to the south of the Adelaide city centre for the first time while removing Labor suburbs in the north-east, resulting in Liberal Trish Worth holding the seat for eleven years, albeit on slender margins.

Kate Ellis regained Adelaide for Labor in 2004 on a 1.3 percent margin from a two percent two-party swing. Ellis increased her margin to 8.5 percent in 2007, before falling to 7.7 percent in 2010 and to 4.0 percent in 2013, before increasing to 4.7 percent in 2016.

In 2016, the major party vote was suppressed in all eleven state seats in the presence of Nick Xenophon Team (NXT) candidates in all eleven South Australian seats. Though Labor picked up a two-party swing in all eleven, the NXT presence produced a result where Kingston ended up as the only South Australian seat to record an increase, however small, to the primary vote of a particular major party. Additionally, Adelaide was the only seat of the state's eleven where the Greens vote increased, while also producing both the highest Green vote and the lowest NXT vote in the state. This is in contrast to 2007 where the Xenophon Senate ticket polled higher in Adelaide than in most other seats.

2018 redistribution and next election
Labor incumbent Kate Ellis announced in March 2017 that she would step down from the Labor shadow cabinet in the following months and would not re-contest her seat at the end of the parliamentary term. The 2018 South Australian federal redistribution saw the seat of Adelaide lose all of its inner-eastern suburbs and a couple of its southern suburbs, while gaining a long strip of western suburbs spanning the entire north-south length of the seat. These changes saw the Labor margin increase significantly from 4.7 percent to a notional 9.0 percent. In July 2018, Steve Georganas, the Labor member for neighbouring Hindmarsh, sought and won preselection for Adelaide at the 2019 election, yielding his former seat to fellow Labor MP Mark Butler, the member for abolished Port Adelaide.

Members

Election results

References
 ABC profile for Adelaide: 2016
 Poll Bludger profile for Adelaide: 2016
 AEC profile for Adelaide: 2016

Notes

External links
 SA boundary map, 2001: AEC
 SA boundary map, 1984: Atlas SA

Electoral divisions of Australia
Constituencies established in 1903
1903 establishments in Australia